Lipovec is a small dispersed settlement in the Municipality of Šmarje pri Jelšah in eastern Slovenia. It lies in the hills south of Šmarje in the northern part of the Kozje region. The area is part of the historical Styria region. The municipality is now included in the Savinja Statistical Region.

References

External links
Lipovec at Geopedia

Populated places in the Municipality of Šmarje pri Jelšah